Cameron Hill (born 26 November 1996) is an Australian racing driver. He currently races in the Dunlop Super2 Series for Triple Eight Race Engineering in the No. 111 Holden Commodore.  Hill won the 2015 Australian Formula Ford Series and 2021 Porsche Carrera Cup Australia.

Career

Karting 
Hill started karting at the age of ten, winning numerous state championships in his junior years. In 2012, Hill won the National Pro Junior (KF3) Australian Championship.

Formula Ford 
Hill progressed to the Australian Formula Ford Championship in 2014. Driving for his privately-run family team, Hill achieved several podium finishes in his rookie season.  In 2015, Hill won the Championship with 12 race wins.

Toyota 86 Racing Series 
In 2016 and 2017 Hill competed in the Australian Toyota 86 Racing Series, finishing 3rd in the Championship in 2016 and 2nd in the Championship in 2017.

Porsche Carrera Cup Australia 
Hill competed in the Porsche Carrera Cup Australia Championship from 2018 to 2021, winning the 2021 Porsche Carrera Cup Australia Championship.

Bathurst 6 Hour 
On 17 April 2022, Hill and co-driver Thomas Sargent won the outright honours in the Bathurst 6 hour endurance race.  Hill and Sargent took the event after starting 63rd and last on the grid.

Dunlop Super 2 Series 
Hill competed in the 2022 Dunlop Super 2 Series for Triple Eight Race Engineering in the No. 111 Holden Commodore.

Supercars Championship 
Hill made his Supercars debut at the 2022 Bathurst 1000, driving for PremiAir Racing. He made his full time debut in 2023 for Matt Stone Racing.

Career race results

Super2 Series results
(key) (Race results only)

Supercars Championship results
(Races in bold indicate pole position) (Races in italics indicate fastest lap)

Complete Bathurst 1000 results

References

External links 
 Official website 
 Cameron Hill career summary at DriverDB.com

1996 births
Living people